Kawangware is a low income residential area in Nairobi, Kenya, about 15 km west of the city centre, between Lavington and Dagoretti.

Description
According to the 2009 Kenya Population and Housing Census, Kawangware's population was 133,286 people at this time. It is estimated that 65% of the population are children and youths. Most inhabitants live on less than $2 (although they earn in shillings) a day and unemployment is high; many are self-employed traders. There is a diversity of ethnic backgrounds.

Kawangware slum has more posho mills than bars, making it an ‘ugali nation’ for its over 130,000 mouths whose palates, unlike those of other Nairobians, have no time for supermarket unga, the grade-one sifted maize meal favoured by middle-class stomachs.

Kawangware has a scarcity of safe drinking water. Water supplied by the city authority is not available every day or is otherwise expensive. There are waterborne diseases, respiratory pneumonia, malaria as well as an increase in cases of airborne diseases due to the poor sewerage system in Kawangware. Many people in Kawangware are HIV-positive.

Kawangware has supermarkets, a library, a medical clinic and the Kawangware Primary School, Kawangware School and Kawangware Academy. However, many children in the slum do not attend school.

See also
Kibera
Mathare
Mathare Valley
Kiambiu
Korogocho
Mukuru slums

References

Populated places in Kenya
Shanty towns in Kenya
Slums in Kenya
Suburbs of Nairobi
Squatting in Kenya